U-126 may refer to one of the following German submarines:

 , a Type UE II submarine launched in 1918 and that served in the First World War until surrendered on 22 November 1918; broken up at Upnor in 1923
 During the First World War, Germany also had this submarine with a similar name:
 , a Type UB III submarine launched in 1918 and surrendered on 24 November 1918; used for French underwater explosion tests; broken up at Toulon in July 1921
 , a Type IXC submarine that served in the Second World War until sunk on 3 July 1943

Submarines of Germany